Reginald Akindele Cline-Cole (born Freetown, Sierra Leone), is a retired University Senior Lecturer (Associate Professor rank) and scholar of Developmental Geography. Upon his formal retirement in May 2021, he is now seconded as a Senior Honorary Research Fellow in the Centre of West African Studies, University of Birmingham. This is an attestation of his wealth of experience and specialism in the area of African development.

Life and study 

Cline-Cole has done extensive work in the field of development issues in rural environments, as well as forestry and its human impact. He was one time head of the Centre of West African Studies, University of Birmingham (UK). He has previously taught at Bayero University, Nigeria and Moi University, Kenya. Despite his retirement, he is still actively engaged in supervising postgraduate students (Masters and PhD).

Selected publications 

Cline-Cole's recent publications include: 
 [with Yulong Ma, William A.Stubbings, Mohamed Abou-Elwafa Abdallah, Stuart Harrad]. Formal waste treatment facilities as a source of halogenated flame retardants and organophosphate esters to the environment: A critical review with particular focus on outdoor air and soil. Science of the Total Environment, Volume 807, Part 1, 10 February 2022, 150747. 
[with Yulong Ma, William A. Stubbings and Stuart Harrad]. Human exposure to halogenated and organophosphate flame retardants through informal e-waste handling activities - A critical review. Environmental Pollution, 115727, 2020. 
 Bouquets and brickbats along the road to development freedom and sovereignty: commentary on'Rethinking the idea of independent development and self-reliance in Africa. African Review of Economics and Finance, 12(1): 260–281, 2020.
 [ed. with Clare Madge] Contesting Forestry in West Africa (Aldershot: Ashgate Press, 2000),
 Promoting (Anti-) Social Forestry in Northern Nigeria ?’ in Review of African Political Economy 24 (74), 1997,
 Dryland Forestry. Manufacturing Forests and Farming Trees in Nigeria’, in M. Leach and R. Mearns [eds], The Lie of the Land: Challenging Received Wisdom on the African Environment (James Currey and Heinneman, 1996)

References

Year of birth missing (living people)
Living people
Sierra Leonean academics
Sierra Leonean geographers
Academics of the University of Birmingham
Sierra Leone Creole people
Academic staff of Moi University
Academic staff of Bayero University Kano